Epichloë siegelii is a hybrid asexual species in the fungal genus Epichloë. 

A systemic and seed-transmissible grass symbiont first described in 2001,  Epichloë siegelii is a natural allopolyploid of Epichloë amarillans and Epichloë elymi.

Epichloë siegelii is found in Europe, where it has been identified in the grass species Schedonorus pratensis (synonymous with Festuca pratensis and Lolium pratense).

References

siegelii
Fungi described in 2001
Fungi of Europe